Khairthal is a town in Khairthal district, in the Indian state of Rajasthan. The town is at the northern end of the Aravalli Range. It has a major industrial importance in Rajasthan because of its connections with Delhi and Jaipur. Khairthal also has one of the biggest grain markets in Rajasthan. In 2000, the APMC Mandi was opened in Khairthal. Khairthal was founded by a community of Brahmin, who were later joined by Sindhi, Pushkarnas and then Vyasya communities. It is well known for milkcake, mustard oil and red onion.

Demographics
 India census, Khairthal had a population of 38,298, including 20,115 men and 18,183 women. Khairthal has an average literacy rate of 82.56%, higher than the state average of 66.11%: male literacy is 89.96%, and female literacy is 74.47%. 13.6% of the population is under the age of six.

Market
Khairthal has the APMC Mandi, which was established in 1965, and moved to a new location in 2000. The main produce includes wheat, pulses, mustard and cotton. Khairthal also has various oil mills.

Transport
Khairthal is well connected by both rail and road. It lies on the Delhi-Jaipur Railway, 130 km from Delhi. Most trains on this route stop at Khairthal, including the Ashram Express, Malani Express, Pooja Express, Kathgodam Express, Katra Express, and Yoga Express.

The town is connected by road to National Highway 8, the Jaipur Delhi Expressway. Connecting points on the NH8 from Khairthal are Kotputli (via Bansoor) on the Jaipur side, and Dharuheda via Kishangarh Bas on the Delhi side. A new highway project is under construction from Kishangarh to Kotputli via Khairthal, which will be on its way by 2014. A new Jaipur-Khairthal express was opened after seeing the number of daily passengers. Recently, a Jaipur-Delhi AC train has been opened with Khairthal as its one of its stops.

The nearest airport is Indira Gandhi International Airport, Delhi. Jaipur International Airport is also close.

References

 http://www.censusindia.gov.in/pca/SearchDetails.aspx?Id=80932
 https://web.archive.org/web/20090410002541/http://agmarknet.nic.in/profile/profile_online/displayformdetails.asp?mkt=256
 http://www.bhaskar.com/news/RAJ-OTH-MAT-latest-khairthal-news-035621-3057638-NOR.html

Cities and towns in Alwar district